Andrew Morey (1 July 1854 – 30 July 1926) was a New Zealand cricketer. He played in one first-class match for Wellington in 1888/89.

See also
 List of Wellington representative cricketers

References

External links
 

1854 births
1926 deaths
New Zealand cricketers
Wellington cricketers
Sportspeople from Kent